Mifergui is a locality in southeastern Guinea near the borders of Liberia and Côte d'Ivoire.

It is the site of yet to be exploited iron ore deposits.

See also 

 Railway stations in Guinea

References

External links 

Populated places in Guinea